Thoranai or Pistha is a 2009 Indian  action drama film written and directed by Sabha Ayyappan, who previously worked as an associate director for Malaikottai, and produced by Vikram Krishna under the banner G K Film Corporation. The film stars Vishal and Shriya Saran and Prakash Raj, Kishore, and Santhanam in another pivotal roles. Shot simultaneously in Tamil and Telugu languages with  Ali replacing Santhanam as Vishal's friend as well as a different supporting cast. Both Tamil and Telugu opened to mixed reviews. It was remade in Bhojpuri with Khesari Lal Yadav as "Shola aur Shabnam".

Synopsis
Guru (Ganesan / Rambabu) and Tamizharasu / Suryaprakash are dreaded gangsters in Chennai/Vizag. They are against pitted each other and fight to establish their supremacy in city. They indulge in gang war painting Chennai / Vizag red. Enters Murugan / Murali Krishna. A native of Madurai / Ramachandrapuram, he comes to Chennai / Vizag with a mission. He leaves his village promising his mother that he would return only with his brother, who had run away from the house about two decades ago.

Murugan / Murali Krishna gets the help of his friend Vellaichamy / Chittibabu. He comes across the gangsters and a sequence of events results in him incurring both their wrath. In a bloody duel with Guru, he learns that he is his brother, whom he has been searching for long. Now he is entrusted with the task of protecting him from Tamizharasu / Suryaprakash. How he accomplishes his task forms the crux.

Cast

Telugu version

 Annapoornamma as Krishna's grandmother 
 Gautam Raju as Traffic police
 Duvvasi Mohan

Production

Casting 
Trisha was cast as the lead actress, but opted out of the film and was subsequently replaced with Shriya. Reema Sen was cast to play the role of a second actresses and Neetu Chandra was considered to play the third heroine. Reema Sen and Neetu Chandra were not part of the final cast.

Music

Tamil version

Telugu version
"Pidi Pidi" - Ranjith, Naveen
"Naa Maharani" - Udit Narayan
"Pattuko Pattuko" - Narayanan, Janani
"Oka Pelican" - Rahul, Suchithra
"Naa Maharani" - Ranjith
"Mandakini" - Tippu, Saindhavi

Reception

Critical response

Tamil version
Behindwoods wrote:"Thoranai does entertain, but a tighter script and better execution could have yielded far better results". Sify wrote:"The problems with Thoranai are sundry. First and foremost, it's got a dead script. Nothing, simply nothing happens in the first half of the film". Rediff wrote:"Thoranai's only merit is that it's marginally better than Sathyam. The Times of India gave the film two stars and wrote that "It is a formidable star cast that you see in "Thoranai". However, what is missing is a convincing story".

Telugu version
The Times of India gave the film one and a half stars out of five stating that "Inspite of a dud like Salute, Tamil star Vishal hasn't realised the significance of a solid plot even for a star-centric film."

References

External links 
 

2009 films
2000s Tamil-language films
2000s masala films
Indian action films
Films scored by Mani Sharma
Indian multilingual films
2009 action films
2008 multilingual films
2009 directorial debut films